Győri ETO FC is a professional association football club based in Győr, Hungary.

Key

Nemzeti Bajnokság I
 Pld = Matches played
 W = Matches won
 D = Matches drawn
 L = Matches lost
 GF = Goals for
 GA = Goals against
 Pts = Points
 Pos = Final position

Hungarian football league system
 NBI = Nemzeti Bajnokság I 
 NBII = Nemzeti Bajnokság II 
 NBIII = Nemzeti Bajnokság III 
 MBI = Megyei Bajnokság I 

Magyar Kupa
 F = Final
 SF = Semi-finals
 QF = Quarter-finals
 R16 = Round of 16
 R32 = Round of 32
 R64 = Round of 64
 R128 = Round of 128

UEFA
 F = Final
 SF = Semi-finals
 QF = Quarter-finals
 Group = Group stage
 PO = Play-offs
 QR3 = Third qualifying round
 QR2 = Second qualifying round
 QR1 = First qualifying round
 PR = Preliminary round

Seasons
As of 30 June 2020.

Notes
Note 1: Since the number of teams of the 1996–97 season of the Hungarian League were expanded by 2 more teams, Győr were not relegated directly even though they finished 15th in the 1995–96 season. Győr had to play relegation play-offs with FC Sopron. The first tie ended in 2–0 victory over Sopron, while the second leg was lost to 2–1.
Note 2: Győr will finish in the top three of the 2011–12 Hungarian National Championship I, but they will not be eligible to enter either the 2012–13 UEFA Champions League or Europa League due to having been suspended from participating in UEFA competitions for the first season they qualify between the 2011–12 and 2013–14 seasons in relation to club licensing violations. As a result, the fourth-placed team of the league will take one of Hungary's Europa League places in the first qualifying round.
Note 3: Relegated to the Nemzeti Bajnokság III due to financial reasons.
Note 4: Zsolt Fórián as caretaker manager.
Note 5: The season was suspended due to the COVID-19 pandemic.

References

External links

Győri ETO FC
Győri